The canton of Saint-Georges-de-l'Oyapock (French: Canton de Saint-Georges-de-l'Oyapock) is one of the former cantons of the Guyane department in French Guiana. It was located in the arrondissement of Cayenne, and consisted of three communes. Its administrative seat was located in Saint-Georges. Its population was 5,644 in 2012.

Communes 

The canton was composed of 3 communes:
Saint-Georges
Camopi
Ouanary

Administration

References

Saint-Georges-de-l'Oyapock